RUM Racquetball Courts are a Racquetball center on UPRM in Mayagüez, Puerto Rico.  Built in 2010 next to the Natatorio RUM.  It held the Racquetball competitions of the 2010 Central American and Caribbean Games.  The  complex has three courts.

References

University of Puerto Rico at Mayagüez
Buildings and structures in Mayagüez, Puerto Rico
Sports venues in Puerto Rico
2010 Central American and Caribbean Games venues
2010 establishments in Puerto Rico
Sports venues completed in 2010